Bondarzewia tibetica is a species of polypore fungus in the family Bondarzewiaceae. Found in Tibet, it was described as new to science in 2016.

References

External links

Fungi described in 2016
Fungi of China
Russulales
Taxa named by Bao-Kai Cui